Dallapé is a Finnish music group established in 1925 by accordionist Masa Jäppilä (1900–1967), singer Ville Alanko (1907–1931) and percussionist Mauno Jonsson who were influenced by American jazz music. Dallapé was the most popular band of Finland in the 1930s and played a significant role in Finnish music life for decades. The band is still active.

Members 
 Juha Hostikka – vocals
 Anssi Nykänen - drums
 Harri Rantanen - bass
 Varre Vartiainen - guitar
 Niko Kumpuvaara - accordion
 Mauri Saarikoski - violin
 Arttu Takalo - xylophone
 Petri Puolitaival - saxophone
 Heikki Pohto - saxophone
 Tero Lindberg - trumpet
 Antti Rissanen - trombone, tuba

Selected past members 
Asser Fagerström
Rauno Lehtinen
Georg Malmstén
Tauno Palo
Tapio Rautavaara
Sami Saari
Tapani Valsta
Viljo Vesterinen
Olavi Virta´

Recordings  
 Tähtisarja – 30 suosikkia (2012, Warner Music)
 Soittajan sussu (2011) Blue Note Records
 Levytyksiä vuosilta 1940–1942 (2011) Artie Music
 Jälleen soittaa Dallapé (2010) Blue Note Records
 Levytyksiä vuodelta 1939 (2009) Artie Music
 Levytyksiä vuosilta 1937–1938 (2008) Artie Music
 Levytyksiä vuosilta 1934–1936 (2007) Artie Music
 Ja vuodet vierivät… – Kosti Seppälä ja Dallapé (2007) Poptori
 Levytyksiä vuosilta 1930–1933 (2006) Artie Music
 Levytyksiä vuodelta 1929 (2006) Artie Music
 20 suosikkia – Levytyksiä vuosilta 1930–1940 (2000) Warner Music Finland
 Juhlalevy (2000) Poptori
 Tuplajättipotti (1995)
 Suomen Joutsen (1989)
 Dallapé-orkesteri (eri esiintyjiä) (2-LP, 1982) Finnlevy
 Dallapé-orkesteri (Viljo Lehtinen) PSO
 Dallapé 50 (1975) PSO
 Konkaritanssit 5 (Kalevi Korpi, Johnny Forsell ja Berit sekä Dallapé-orkesteri) (1974) PSO
 Konkaritanssit 2 (Kalevi Korpi ja Martti Suuntala sekä Dallapé-orkesteri) (1972) PSO
 Dallapé-orkesteri (Kalevi Korpi ja Johnny Forsell) (1971) PSO

References

External links 
 Dallapé Official Home Page (in Finnish and English)

Finnish jazz ensembles
Finnish schlager groups
Musical groups established in 1925